Ivan Seljak, nom de guerre Čopič (7 December 1927 – 1990) was a Slovene painter and illustrator.

Seljak was born in Idrija in 1927. During the Second World War he joined the Slovene Partisans as a young military courier, where he met Božidar Jakac and other artists who encouraged his artistic talent. After the war he studied at the Academy of Fine Arts in Ljubljana, from which he graduated in 1951. His main medium was painting, but he also illustrated numerous children's books. He won the Levstik Award for his illustrations three times: in 1955, 1963, and 1976. He also won the Prešeren Foundation Award in 1975 for the exhibitions of his paintings. He died in 1990.

Selected illustrated works

  (Marching to Freedom), written by Peter Levec, 1945
  (A Child of a Dark Race), written by Jože Pahor, 1947
  (The Three Daughters), Tatar folk tale, 1953
  (The Crew without a Ship), written by Tone Seliškar, 1955
  (The Book about Tito), written by France Bevk, 1955
  (Twelve), written by Alexander Blok, 1957
  (The Harsh North), written by Pavel Kunaver, 1958
  (Short Stories), written by Guy de Maupassant, 1958
  (Happy and Sad Stories about Mules), written by Tone Seliškar, 1963
  (Aska and the Wolf), written by Ivo Andrić, 1963
 Gregec Kobilica (Gregec Kobilica), written by Branka Jurca, 1965
 Robinson Crusoe (Robinson Crusoe), written by Daniel Defoe, 1975
  (My Song), poetry by Karel Destovnik, 1985

References

Slovenian male painters
Slovenian illustrators
Yugoslav Partisans members
1927 births
1990 deaths
People from Idrija
Levstik Award laureates
Ethnic Slovene people
University of Ljubljana alumni
20th-century Slovenian painters
20th-century Slovenian male artists